Tlapacoya may refer to:

Tlapacoya Municipality, a municipality in the state of Puebla, Mexico
Tlapacoya, Calpan in Calpan Municipality, Puebla
Tlapacoya (Mesoamerican site), an archaeological site in the Valley of Mexico